Emily Tredger is a Canadian politician, who was elected to the Yukon Legislative Assembly in the 2021 Yukon general election. She represents the electoral district of Whitehorse Centre as a member of the Yukon New Democratic Party.

Prior to her election to the legislature Tredger worked as a speech pathologist in Whitehorse, including as executive director of Teegatha’Oh Zheh, an organization supporting Yukon residents with developmental disabilities, and served as president of the Queer Yukon Society.

Tredger is openly lesbian.

Tredger serves as the Yukon New Democratic Party House Leader and the Deputy Chair of Committee of the Whole of the Yukon Legislative Assembly

Electoral record

References 

Living people
Yukon New Democratic Party MLAs
Women MLAs in Yukon
Canadian LGBT people in provincial and territorial legislatures
Lesbian politicians
Politicians from Whitehorse
21st-century Canadian women politicians
Year of birth missing (living people)
21st-century Canadian LGBT people